Klaus Linde (born 1960 in Munich) is a German physician and alternative medicine researcher. He works at the Centre for Complementary Medicine Research at the Technical University of Munich in Germany.

Education and career
Linde received his MD from Ludwig Maximilian University of Munich in 1990 and his PhD in epidemiology from the Humboldt University of Berlin in 2002. Since 1998 he has been the deputy director of the Centre for Complementary Medicine Research at the Technical University of Munich.

Research
He is known for his research into the effectiveness of St. John's wort, which has found that it is as effective as Prozac for treating major depression, and that German trials of the herb tend to be more positive than do trials from other countries.

He is also known for his studies of the effectiveness of acupuncture. A 2005 study by Linde, for example, found that real acupuncture was no more effective in the treatment of migraines than sham acupuncture, but that both were more effective than no treatment. He has also authored multiple Cochrane reviews on the effectiveness of acupuncture with similar conclusions.

He has also published several papers about the effectiveness of homeopathy. These include a well-known 1997 meta-analysis which found an odds ratio of 2.45 in favor of homeopathy over placebo. However, this review also concluded that there was insufficient evidence that homeopathy was clearly effective for any single condition. A subsequent study by Linde et al. re-examined the data from his 1997 meta-analysis and found that higher quality trials of homeopathy tended to find that homeopathy was ineffective.

References

Alternative medicine researchers
Living people
Academic staff of the Technical University of Munich
German medical researchers
Physicians from Munich
1960 births
Ludwig Maximilian University of Munich alumni
Humboldt University of Berlin alumni